Francis Joseph (Frank) Nowacki FRIBA (17 May 1947 – 24 February 2020) was a 20th/21st-century British architect who is remembered for his major project work in Dubai. He was Director of John R. Harris Partners (JRHP) Architects (the company earlier responsible for Dubai World Trade Centre).

Life

Frank Nowacki was born on 17 May 1947 in Doncaster, England. He was educated there at St Peters Roman Catholic High School, from 1958 to 1964. After initially studying engineering, a role as a site manager inspired him to study architecture, and he studied at Edinburgh College of Art graduating BA DipArch in 1975. He then settled in Edinburgh for the next 25 years.

Following qualification in 1975 he joined Douglas Abrahams and Partners, where he won a commendation for his design for a Beatles Museum in Liverpool. He later moved to Walter Wood Associates (WWA).

Until 2000 when Nowacki moved to Dubai, he lived at 99 East Claremont Street in the eastern New Town of Edinburgh.

In 2015, JRHP was taken over by the London-based architects, Aukett Swanke.

Nowacki died of motor neuron disease on 24 February 2020. He was cremated at the Lorimer Chapel in Warriston Crematorium on 6 March 2020.

Family
Frank) Nowacki was married twice. From his first marriage, he had a son, Simon Nowacki.

In 1997, Nowacki married Lesley who had two children by a previous marriage: Chris and Jenny.

Principal works
Nowacki was involved with the following:

TFG Tower
Marix Tower
Bulgari Hotel Dubai
Various buildings at Dubai Sports City
Sharjah English School
Dubai Community Arts Centre
Mall of the Emirates
Retail element at Dubai Festival City
Wafi Shopping Mall
UK Pavilion, Expo 2020, Dubai
The Arc, Bury St Edmunds
Yas Mall Hotel
Mercedes-Benz World, Dubai
Radisson Blu Hotel, Dubai
Sheikh Zayed Learning Centre
Fontenay Hotel, Hamburg
International City Mall, Dubai

References

1947 births
2020 deaths
People from Doncaster
British architects
British expatriates in the United Arab Emirates
Emirati architects
Architecture in Dubai